Les Sables d'Olonne Agglomération is the communauté d'agglomération, an intercommunal structure, centred on the city of Les Sables-d'Olonne. It is located in the Vendée department, in the Pays de la Loire region, western France. Created in 2017, its seat is in Les Sables-d'Olonne. Its area is 172.1 km2. Its population was 54,258 in 2019, of which 45,030 in Les Sables-d'Olonne proper.

Composition
The communauté d'agglomération consists of the following 5 communes:
L'Île-d'Olonne
Les Sables-d'Olonne
Sainte-Foy
Saint-Mathurin
Vairé

References

Sables-d'Olonne
Sables-d'Olonne